The 2016 Magny-Cours Superbike World Championship round was the eleventh round of the 2016 Superbike World Championship. It took place over the weekend of 30 September and 1–2 October 2016 at the Circuit de Nevers Magny-Cours.

Championship standings after the round

Superbike Championship standings after Race 1

Superbike Championship standings after Race 2

Supersport Championship standings

External links
 Superbike Race 1 results
 Superbike Race 2 results
 Supersport Race results

2016 Superbike World Championship season
2016 in French motorsport
October 2016 sports events in France